J-Alert (full name ) is the early warning system used in Japan. J-Alert was launched in February 2007. The system is designed to quickly inform the public of threats and emergencies such as earthquakes, severe weather, and other dangers. The system was developed in the hope that early warnings would speed up evacuation times and help coordinate emergency response.

System
J-Alert is a satellite based system that allows authorities to quickly broadcast alerts to local media and to citizens directly via a system of nationwide loudspeakers, television, radio, email, and cell broadcasts. According to Japanese officials, it takes about one second to inform local officials, and between four and twenty seconds to relay the message to citizens. An enhanced version of the J-Alert receivers were installed by the end of March 2019. The new models can automatically process the information within two seconds, compared to the older models that can take up to twenty seconds.

All warnings, except for severe weather warnings, are broadcast in five languages: Japanese, English, Mandarin, Korean, and Portuguese (Japan has a small Chinese, Korean, and Brazilian population, as well as British, American, and other English-speaking populations). The warnings were broadcast in these languages during the 2011 Tōhoku earthquake and tsunami. The severe weather warnings are only broadcast in Japanese.

J-Alert broadcasts via both ground systems and the Superbird-B3 communication satellite.

When there is a civil emergency such as a ballistic missile heading towards Japan, a special air raid siren sounds across loudspeakers and on TV and radio.

Information transmission capabilities

 
Earthquake
Earthquake Early Warning
Quick updates on hypocenter, magnitude, and precautions of possible tsunami
Information of hypocenter, magnitude, intensities of various areas, and the presence of tsunami
Earthquake prediction warning for the Tōkai earthquakes
Earthquake prediction advisory information of the Tōkai earthquakes
Earthquake prediction information of the Tōkai earthquakes
Tsunami
Major tsunami warning
Tsunami warning
Tsunami advisory
Volcano eruption
Emergency warning of volcanic eruption and the possibility of eruption
Warning of volcanic eruption and the possibility of eruption
Volcanic crater forecast
Severe weather
Emergency warnings for heavy rain, heavy snow, gale, snowstorm, waves, and storm surge
Warnings for heavy rain, heavy snow, gale, snowstorm, waves, and storm surge
Weather advisory
Information of the risk of landslides
Advisory information for tornado
Information of violent heavy rain
Flood forecast
Special emergency threats
Information of ballistic missiles
Information of airstrikes
Information of guerrilla and special forces attacks
Information of large-scale terrorism
Other information for civil and national defense

Adoption rate
Many prefectures and urban areas were slow in adopting the system. Upon its introduction, the Japanese government hoped to have 80% of the country equipped with the J-Alert system by 2009. However, by 2011, only 36% of the nation had been covered. Cost had been a major factor; the initial installation is estimated to be around 430 million yen, and the yearly maintenance is estimated to be around 10 million yen.

By May 2013, 99.6% of municipalities nationwide were covered.

See also
Emergency population warning

References

External links
 J-Alert Overview Fire and Disaster Management Agency, Ministry of Internal Affairs and Communications
 国民保護室・国民保護運用室  Fire and Disaster Management Agency, Ministry of Internal Affairs and Communications
 北朝鮮から発射された弾道ミサイルが日本に飛来する可能性がある場合における全国瞬時警報システム（Ｊアラート）による情報伝達について Cabinet Secretariat Civil Protection
 全国瞬時警報システム（J-ALERT）の整備 Ministry of Internal Affairs and Communications
 Guide on disaster prevention and mitigation effort during earthquakes and tsunamis Japan Meteorological Agency
 Protecting guide against Armed Attacks or Terrorism Cabinet Secretariat Civil Protection
 J-Alert message relayed during the 2011 Tōhoku earthquake, warning of an imminent tsunami
 全国瞬時警報システム 実際の放送例 (J-Alert Demonstration) YouTube

Emergency management in Japan
Emergency population warning systems
2007 establishments in Japan
2007 introductions